Şıxlar is a former village in the Gobustan District of Azerbaijan. The village formed part of the municipality of Xilmilli.

References 

Populated places in Gobustan District